Luncarty (pronounced Lung-cur-tay) ) is a village in Perth and Kinross, Scotland, approximately  north of Perth. It lies between the A9 to the west, and the River Tay to the east.

Etymology
The name Luncarty, recorded in 1250 as Lumphortyn, may be of Gaelic origin. The name may involve the element longartaibh, a plural form of longphort meaning variously "harbour, palace, encampment".

History

The historian Hector Boece (1465–1536), in his History of the Scottish People, records that, in 990, Kenneth III of Scotland defeated the Danes near Luncarty. However, the Scottish historian John Hill Burton strongly suspected the battle of Luncarty to be an invention of Hector Boece.  Burton was incorrect. Walter Bower, writing in his Scotichronicon around 1440, some 87 years before Boece first published his Scotorum Historia, refers to the battle briefly as follows:
"that remarkable battle of Luncarty, in which the Norsemen with their king were totally destroyed". Bower does not quote specific sources concerning the battle, but, two sentences later, he refers in a general way to ancient writings that he has consulted. The term Norsemen would include Danes.

The present village was founded in 1752 by William Sandeman, to house workers at his bleachfields. The village formerly had a railway station, and the Perth to Inverness railway line still runs through the village.

A rare example of a morthouse is located in the churchyard, built to frustrate the activities of bodysnatchers in the 19th century.

Bleachfields
In 1752 he leveled  of land in Luncarty to form bleachfields. By 1790 when William died, the Luncarty bleachfields covered  and processed  of cloth annually. Second only to agriculture, linen manufacture was a major Scottish industry in the late 18th century — linen then became less important with the introduction of cotton.

Sport

Notable persons

 Christopher Bowes, musician
 Jimmy Guthrie, footballer
 Jim Patterson, footballer
 George Turnbull, civil engineer

References

External links

Luncarty Community Website

Villages in Perth and Kinross
1752 establishments in Scotland
Populated places established in 1752